Aulacephala is a genus of flies in the family Tachinidae.

Species
 Aulacephala hervei Bequaert, 1922

References

Tachinidae